Białystok is a eucrite meteorite (previously classified as howardite) that fell on 5 October 1827 in the area of Fasty and Knyszyn villages,  NNW of Białystok, Poland. The fall occurred at around 9:30 am. Several specimens were recovered.

See also
Glossary of meteoritics
Meteorite fall

References

External links
Meteorical Bulletin Database: Białystok

Meteorites found in Poland
Asteroidal achondrites
1827 in the Russian Empire
1827 in Poland